Mary Bard Jensen (1904–1970) was a 20th-century American writer best remembered as the sister of Betty Macdonald (Mrs. Piggle-Wiggle, The Egg and I).

Life and career
Mary Bard was born in Butte, Montana in 1904, the eldest of five children. With their mining engineer father, the family traveled all over the country, moving so frequently that Bard did not complete one uninterrupted year of school until she was 13. After a year at the University of Washington and stints as a stenographer, filing clerk, and switchboard operator, she settled on advertising and wrote radio commercials.

Bard was the author of the three-volume Best Friends series for girls. She also wrote three autobiographical works: Just Be Yourself, The Doctor Wears Three Faces, and Forty Odd. Married to a doctor, she was the mother of three daughters.

Death
Jensen died in December 1970 after stroke at the age of 66.

Works

 The Doctor Wears Three Faces (1949);
 Forty Odd (1952);
 Best Friends (1955); 
 Just Be Yourself (1956);
 Best Friends in Summer (1960);
 Best Friends at School (1961).

References

External links 

 Mary Bard Jensen Society
  (largely as 'Bard, Mary' without '1904–1970', previous page of browse report)

1904 births
1970 deaths
American children's writers
People from Butte, Montana
University of Washington alumni